Arne Larsson (26 May 1915 – 28 December 2001) was the first patient to receive an artificial cardiac pacemaker. The first two pacemakers were implanted by Åke Senning in 1958. Arne lived for another forty-three years and during that time went through twenty-six pacemakers.

He died from melanoma on 28 December 2001 after being diagnosed two years prior.

References

1915 births
2001 deaths
Deaths from melanoma
20th-century Swedish people
People from Västmanland County